Brian Thies is an  American comic book creator, best known for his work on Star Wars: Legacy, Secret Avengers, The Amazing Spider-Man, and Winter Soldier.

Personal life
He currently lives in Washington, where he shares a studio with  Moritat, Jen Vaughn, and Stefano Gaudiano.

Bibliography

Penciller
Star Wars: Legacy  (Dark Horse Comics, 2013)
The Amazing Spider-Man (Marvel Comics, 1963)
Harbinger (2012)
Secret Avengers (Marvel Comics, 2013)
Star Wars: Legacy (Dark Horse Comics, 2013)

Inker
The Amazing Spider-Man (Marvel Comics, 1963)
Dark Tower: The Gunslinger - The Battle of Tull (Marvel Comics, 2011)
Defenders (2012)
Harbinger (2012)
Secret Avengers (Marvel Comics, 2010)
Secret Avengers (Marvel Comics, 2013)
Star Wars: Legacy (Dark Horse Comics, 2013)
Winter Soldier (Marvel Comics, 2012)

References

General references

Inline citations

External links

Comic Book Resources

Living people
1979 births
American comics creators